Cowtown may refer to:

Nicknames of places

United States 
 Cattle towns, a generic name often associated with the American Old West
 Columbus, Ohio
 Fort Worth, Texas
 Kansas City, Missouri
 Vacaville, California
 Wichita, Kansas

Elsewhere 
 Cowaramup, Western Australia, Australia
 Calgary, Alberta, Canada

Other uses 
 Cow Town, a 1950 American Western film
 A song from the album Lincoln by They Might Be Giants
 Cowtown Guitars, a vintage guitar shop in Las Vegas, Nevada
 Cow Town Showdown, skateboarding competition at the Arnold Sports Festival in Columbus, Ohio

See also 
 Cowtown Coliseum
 Cowtown Rodeo
 Cowtown Speedway
 Old Cowtown Museum
 The Hot Club of Cowtown